The Chengdu Art Academy is an arts organization, supporting contemporary art and the Chengdu Art Museum with a collection of artworks, based in the city of Chengdu, Sichuan, China.

Overview
The academy is organized by the Chinese government. It recruits mature professional artists and most receive a salary for producing their work, but it does not operate as an art school with students such as the Chengdu Academy of Fine Arts.

History
The Chengdu Art Academy was founded in 1980, as the first Chinese professional art organization established by the Chinese government. Its remit includes painting and calligraphy creation, research into art theory, and academic communication. Originally the Chengdu Art Academy was located in the Culture Park. In 1983, it was moved to 59 Zhijishi Street. The style of the buildings is a typical quadrangle of western Sichuan historic houses dating from the late Qing dynasty. In 2007, the premises were approved as a Sichuan Provincial Heritage Conservation Site. A project to protect and maintain the buildings was completed in 2008. The buildings were opened by the academy as the Chengdu Art Museum. During October to December 2020, the Academy/Museum buildings were closed to the public for maintenance.

On 6 November 2021, at the Tianfu Art Park and at the start of the 2021 Chengdu Biennale, the Chengdu Art Academy launched two new contemporary art museum buildings in the park, namely the Chengdu Tianfu Art Museum and the Chengdu Museum of Contemporary Art, forming a new focus for the Chengdu Art Museum. As a result, the academy is now based at the park.

See also
 Chengdu Academy of Fine Arts
 Sichuan Conservatory of Music, Chengdu
 Sichuan Fine Arts Institute, Chongqing

References

External links
 Chengdu Art Academy official site on Weibo.com 

1980 establishments in China
Arts organizations established in 1980
Arts organizations based in China
Academies of arts
Organizations based in Chengdu
Arts in Chengdu